Hillwood may refer to:
 Hillwood, Tasmania, Australia
 Hillwood Volcano Tasmania, Australia 
 Amanda Hillwood, British actress
 Hillwood Estate, Museum & Gardens in Washington, D.C., United States
 Hillwood Comprehensive High School in Nashville, Tennessee, United States
 Hillwood Academic Day School in San Francisco, California, United States
 Hillwood (album) by South Park Mexican
 Hillwood, Washington, a fictional city from the animated series Hey Arnold!

See also
Hill-Wood baronets